William Emmett Smith (March 24, 1933 – July 5, 2021) was an American actor. In a Hollywood career spanning more than 79 years, he appeared in almost three hundred feature films and television productions in a wide variety of character roles, accumulating over 980 total credits, with his best known role being the menacing Anthony Falconetti in the 1970s television mini-series Rich Man, Poor Man. Smith is also known for films like Any Which Way You Can (1980), Conan The Barbarian (1982), Rumble Fish (1983), and Red Dawn (1984), as well as lead roles in several exploitation films during the 1990s.

Early life and career

Smith was born on March 24, 1933, in Columbia, Missouri, to William Emmett Smith and Emily Richards Smith, and grew up on the cattle ranch owned by his parents. His family later moved to Southern California, where he began his acting career at the age of eight in 1942; entering films as a child actor in such films as The Ghost of Frankenstein, The Song of Bernadette and Meet Me in St. Louis.

Smith served in the United States Air Force. He won the 200-pound (91 kg) arm-wrestling championship of the world multiple times and also won the United States Air Force weightlifting championship. A lifelong bodybuilder, Smith was a record holder for reverse-curling his own body weight. His trademark arms measured as much as  inches. Smith held a 31–1 record as an amateur boxer. A fluent Russian speaker, during the Korean War Smith was a Russian Intercept Interrogator and flew secret ferret missions over the Russian SFSR. He was reportedly also fluent in French, German and Serbo-Croatian.

In the years from 1961 to 2014, Smith established himself as a highly prolific and profoundly talented character actor with roles in a diverse range of genres. Although often typecast as an anti-social personality, he sporadically got other kinds of roles as a law enforcement officer or an anti-heroic protagonist. He was a regular on the 1961 ABC television series The Asphalt Jungle, portraying police Sergeant Danny Keller. In 1964, he appeared in the episode "The Rope of Lies" as Bill, a ranch hand from the Shiloh Ranch in the syndicated television series The Virginian. One of his earliest leading roles was as Joe Riley, a good-natured Texas Ranger on the NBC western series Laredo (1965–1967). In 1967, Smith guest starred as Jude Bonner on James Arness's long-lived western Gunsmoke.

On Gunsmoke, Smith appeared in a 1972 episode, "Hostage!"; his character beats and rapes Amanda Blake's character Miss Kitty Russell and shoots her twice in the back. Smith has been described as the "greatest bad-guy character actor of our time".

Smith joined the cast of the final season of Hawaii Five-O as Detective James "Kimo" Carew, a new officer in the Five-O unit. He had previously appeared with Jack Lord in Stoney Burke. Smith starred in one episode each of the Adam West Batman TV series (in the episode "Minerva, Mayhem and Millionaires" as Adonis, one of the minions of the title guest villainess portrayed by Zsa Zsa Gabor), I Dream of Jeannie (in the episode "Operation: First Couple on the Moon" as Turk Parker), Kung Fu, and as The Treybor, a ruthless warlord, in the Buck Rogers in the 25th Century episode "Buck's Duel to the Death". Smith also made guest appearances opposite James Garner in the 1974 two-hour pilot for The Rockford Files (titled "Backlash of the Hunter" and also featuring Lindsay Wagner and Bill Mumy), and George Peppard in The A-Team (in two appearances as different characters, in the first season's "Pros and Cons" and the fourth season's "The A-Team Is Coming, The A-Team Is Coming").

In the 1976 television miniseries Rich Man, Poor Man, he portrayed Anthony Falconetti, nemesis of the Jordache family, and reprised the role in the sequel, Rich Man, Poor Man Book II. Other 1970s TV appearances included the Kolchak: The Night Stalker episode "The Energy Eater", as an Indian medicine man who advises Kolchak, and an early Six Million Dollar Man episode "Survival of the Fittest" as Commander Maxwell.  He also appeared in the 1979 miniseries The Rebels as John Waverly, in an episode of The Dukes of Hazzard as Jason Steele, a bounty hunter hired by Sheriff Rosco P. Coltrane to frame the Duke Boys into jail, and in an episode of Knight Rider as Harold Turner, the manipulative leader of a hellish biker gang whom David Hasselhoff's character Michael Knight has to outsmart.

On the big screen, Smith became the star of several cult movies from the early seventies. Smith appeared as heavy Terry Bartell in Darker than Amber in 1970. In the fist fight scene that ends the film, Rod Taylor hit Smith (who was playing the villain) who retaliated in kind, and a staged-fight scene became a real fight as the cameras continued to roll. Smith later reported that Taylor was "a very tough guy" who broke three of his ribs while he broke Taylor's nose.

Also in 1970, Smith featured in two biker flicks Nam's Angels (originally released under the title "The Losers") co-starring Bernie Hamilton and C.C. and Company with Ann-Margret, Joe Namath, Jennifer Billingsley and genre favorite, Sid Haig, the latter of which was directed by Seymour Robbie and written by Ann-Margret's husband, actor Roger Smith. He starred in 1972's Grave of the Vampire as James Eastman (co-starring with Michael Pataki and Lyn Peters), and 1973's Invasion of the Bee Girls (co-starring Victoria Vetri, Anitra Ford and Katie Saylor, written by Nicholas Meyer and directed by Denis Sanders), and 1975's The Swinging Barmaids (starring Ms. Saylor, Bruce Watson and Laura Hippe, and directed by Gus Trikonis). In 1972 and 1975, respectively, he appeared in two popular Blaxploitation films, Hammer and the controversially titled Boss Nigger, both with Fred Williamson. In 1972, he appeared in a Columbo episode "The Greenhouse Jungle" as Ken Nichols, a handsome swindler who may be a person of interest in Columbo's murder investigation. After that, he played a vindictive sergeant in Twilight's Last Gleaming (1977) with an all-star cast headed by Burt Lancaster and Richard Widmark, a drag-racing legend in Fast Company (1979) also co-starring Claudia Jennings and John Saxon, the main character's father in Conan the Barbarian (1982) with Arnold Schwarzenegger, bad guy Matt Diggs in The Frisco Kid (1979) opposite Gene Wilder and Harrison Ford, and Clint Eastwood's bare-knuckle opponent Jack Wilson in 1980's Any Which Way You Can (a sequel to 1978's Every Which Way But Loose in which Smith did not appear), and also had a top villainous role of the Soviet commander in the hit 1984 theatrical film Red Dawn.

In 1983, Smith appeared in two films from Francis Ford Coppola, in The Outsiders as a store clerk and in Rumble Fish as a police officer. In 1985, Smith landed the starring role of Brodie Hollister in the short-lived Disney Western series Wildside, created by writer-producer Tom Greene, and another role as the bookmaker Dutchman's strongarm enforcer known simply as "Panama Hat", in director Richard Brooks's final movie, Fever Pitch (1985) opposite Ryan O'Neal. Although it was reported that Smith retired from film in 2014 with his last screen appearance, he did make a cameo appearance in the Steve Carell comedy, Irresistible (2020).

Post-retirement
In 2009, Smith published The Poetic Works of William Smith.

Smith died at the Motion Picture & Television Country House and Hospital in Los Angeles, on July 5, 2021, at the age of 88.

Selected filmography

 1942 The Ghost of Frankenstein as Village boy in courtroom (uncredited)
 1943 The Song of Bernadette as Sleeping Boy (uncredited)
 1944 Going My Way as Choir Member (uncredited)
 1944 Meet Me in St. Louis as Little Boy (uncredited)
 1945 A Tree Grows in Brooklyn as Boy (uncredited)
 1946 Gilda as Man (uncredited)
 1947 I Wonder Who's Kissing Her Now as Young Boy (uncredited)
 1948 The Boy with Green Hair as Boy (uncredited)
 1958 High School Confidential as Minor Role (uncredited)
 1959 The Mating Game as Barney
 1959 Ask Any Girl as Young Man (uncredited)
 1959 Girls Town as Man (uncredited)
 1959 Never So Few as MP Officer #1 (uncredited)
 1959 The Gazebo as Actor (uncredited)
 1961 Go Naked in the World as Minor Role
 1961 The Asphalt Jungle (TV series) as Sergeant Danny Keller
 1961 Atlantis, the Lost Continent as Captain of The Guard
 1962 Zero One (TV series) as Jimmy Delaney
 1964 36 Hours as Guy (uncredited)
 1964 Mail Order Bride as Lank
 1965 Laredo (TV series) as Joe Riley
 1968 Batman as Adonis - Episode: "Minerva, Mayhem and Millionaires"
 1968 Three Guns for Texas as Ranger Joe Riley
 1969 The Over-the-Hill Gang as Amos
 1969 Run, Angel, Run! as Angel
 1970 Nam's Angels as Link Thomas
 1970 Angels Die Hard as Tim
 1970 Darker than Amber as Terry
 1970 C.C. and Company as Moon
 1970 Crowhaven Farm as Patrolman Hayes
 1971 Summertree as Draft Lawyer
 1971 Chrome and Hot Leather as T.J.
 1972 The Thing with Two Heads as Hysterical Condemned Man
 1972 Hammer as Brenner
 1972 Piranha, Piranha as Caribe
 1972 Grave of the Vampire as James Eastman
 1972 The Runaway as Frank
 1973 The Fuzz Brothers as Sonny
 1973 Gentle Savage as John Allen, Camper
 1973 Sweet Jesus, Preacherman as Martelli
 1973 Invasion of the Bee Girls as Neil Agar
 1973 The Last American Hero as Kyle Kingman
 1973 The Deadly Trackers as Schoolboy
 1973 A Taste of Hell as Jack Lowell
 1974 Policewomen as The Karate Instructor
 1974 Black Samson as Giovanni "Johnny" Nappa
 1974 Planet of the Apes as Tolar - Episode: "The Gladiators"
 1974 Kolchak: The Night Stalker as Jim Elkhorn - Episode: "The Energy Eater"
 1974 Win, Place or Steal as Tom
 1974 The Rockford Files as Jerry Grimes - Episode: "Backlash of the Hunter" 
 1975 Boss Nigger as Jed Clayton
 1975 The Swinging Barmaids as Lieutenant Harry White
 1975 The Ultimate Warrior as "Carrot"
 1975 Dr. Minx as Gus Dolan
 1976 Scorchy as Carl Henrich
 1976 Rich Man, Poor Man as Anthony Falconetti
 1976 Rich Man, Poor Man Book II as Anthony Falconetti
 1976 Hollywood Man as Rafe Stoker
 1977 Twilight's Last Gleaming as Hoxey
 1978 Blood and Guts as Dan O'Neil
 1978 Blackjack as Andy Mayfield
 1979 The Frisco Kid as Matt Diggs
 1979 Seven as Drew Savano
 1979 The Rebels as John Waverly
 1979 Fast Company as Lonnie "Lucky Man" Johnson
 1979 Hawaii Five-O - Detective James "Kimo" Carew
 1980 Any Which Way You Can as Jack Wilson 
 1981 Dukes of Hazzard as Jason Steele - Episode: "10 Million Dollar Sheriff"
 1982 Conan the Barbarian as Conan's father 
 1983 Rumble Fish as Officer Patterson
 1983 The A-Team 
Staffel 1
Folge 4
 1983 The Outsiders as The Store Clerk
 1984 Red Dawn as Colonel Strelnikov
 1984 The Jerk, Too as Suicide
 1985 Wildside (TV Series) as Brodie Hollister
 1985 The Mean Season as Albert O'Shaughnessy
 1985 When Nature Calls as The Husband ("Gena's Story" trailer)
 1985 Fever Pitch as "Panama Hat"
 1986 Eye of the Tiger as "Blade"
 1987 Commando Squad as Morgan Denny
 1987 Moon in Scorpio as Burt
 1987 The Badd One as Badd
 1988 Bulletproof as Russian Major
 1988 Platoon Leader as Major Flynn
 1988 Maniac Cop as Captain Ripley
 1988 Hell on the Battleground as Colonel Meredith
 1988 Hell Comes To Frogtown as Captain Devlin / Count Sodom
 1988 Evil Altar as Reed Weller
 1989 Jungle Assault as General Mitchell
 1989 Slow Burn as Antonio Scarpelli
 1989 Action U.S.A. as Conover
 1989 Empire of Ash III as Lucas
 1989 Terror in Beverly Hills as The President
 1989 Memorial Valley Massacre as General Mintz
 1989 East L.A. Warriors as Martelli
 1989 B.O.R.N. as Dr. Farley
 1989 Deadly Breed as Captain
 1990 Instant Karma as Pop
 1990 Emperor of the Bronx as Fitz
 1990 Cartel as Mason
 1990 Chance as Captain Joe Wilkes
 1990 The Final Sanction as Major Galashkin
 1990 Forgotten Heroes as General Gregori Zelenkov
 1991 Spirit of the Eagle as Hatchett
 1991 Merchant of Evil as Victor Fortunetti
 1991 Kiss and Be Killed as Detective Murdoch
 1991 The Roller Blade Seven as Pharaoh
 1991 Hard Time Romance
 1991 Cybernator as Colonel Peck
 1992 The Last Riders as "Hammer"
 1992 American Me as Deacon
 1992 Shadow of the Dragon as Eric Brunner
 1992 The Legend of the Roller Blade Seven as "Pharaoh"
 1992 Legend of Skull Canyon as Charlie "Conchos Charlie"
 1992 Feast as Detective George Bordelli
 1992 Dark Secrets as Robert
 1992 A Mission to Kill as Boris Catuli
 1993 Road to Revenge as Normad
 1994 Maverick as Riverboat Poker Player
 1994 Manosaurus as Sheriff Todd
 1995 Taken Alive as L.E.
 1995 Raw Energy as Sam Stompkins
 1995 Judee Strange as Judee
 1995 Big Sister 2000 as The Man
 1996 Uncle Sam as Major
 1996 Neon Signs as Clyde
 1997 Hollywood Cops as Rinaldi
 1997 The Shooter as Jerry Krants
 1997 Interview with a Zombie as Zombie
 1997 Doublecross on Costa's Island as L.E.
 1998 Broken Vessels as Bo
 1998 Warriors of the Apocolypse as Moon
 1998 No Rest for the Wicked as Frank Love
 1999 Wasteland Justice as Moon
 2000 Vice as "Spooky" Harlow
 2000 Plastic Boy and the Jokers as Dr. Taylor
 2001 The Elite as Colonel Shaw
 2002 Body Shop as Sheriff Taggart
 2003 The Rock n' Roll Cops as Rinaldi
 2003 God Has a Rap Sheet as Lucifer
 2004 Y.M.I. as Cal
 2004 Killer Story as Monty – 'The Wrap'
 2006 Voices from the Graves as Lester Jiggs
 2006 Inner Rage as Sam
 2007 Rapturious as Sheriff
 2012 Tiger Cage as Katulic
 2014 Island of Witches as Vladislav Titov
 2020 Irresistible as Hofbrau Bar Fly

References

External links

Facebook

1933 births
2021 deaths
Male actors from Missouri
American male film actors
American male child actors
United States Air Force personnel of the Korean War
American male television actors
Ludwig Maximilian University of Munich alumni
Actors from Columbia, Missouri
Syracuse University alumni
United States Air Force airmen
University of California, Los Angeles alumni
University of Paris alumni
20th-century American male actors
21st-century American male actors
Male Western (genre) film actors
Golden Boot Awards recipients